Jaime Blanch Montijano (born 1940) is a Spanish film and television actor.

Selected filmography
 I Was a Parish Priest (1953)
 Jeromin (1953)
 An Andalusian Gentleman (1954)
 An Angel Has Arrived (1961)
 La gran familia (1962)
 Como dos gotas de agua (1963)
 Pedrito de Andía's New Life (1965)
 Forget the Drums (1975)
 The Day of the Beast (1995)
 El Ministerio del Tiempo (2015- )

References

Bibliography 
 Goble, Alan. The Complete Index to Literary Sources in Film. Walter de Gruyter, 1999.

External links 
 

1940 births
Living people
Spanish male television actors
Spanish male film actors
People from Madrid
20th-century Spanish male actors
21st-century Spanish male actors